Harukaze (Japanese "spring breeze") may refer to:

Ships

Songs
Harukaze (song), a song by Scandal
"Harukaze" :ja:はるかぜ (doaの曲), song by Doa (Japanese band) 2007
"Harukaze" :ja:春風 (くるりの曲), song by Quruli 2000 
"Harukaze" :ja:春風 (ゆずの曲), song by Yuzu (band) 2007 
"Harukaze" :ja:春風 (Rihwaの曲), song by Rihwa 2014